The Engin Blindé de Reconnaissance et de Combat Jaguar (English: Armoured Reconnaissance and Combat Vehicle Jaguar) or EBRC Jaguar is a French armoured reconnaissance vehicle that will replace the French Army's AMX-10 RC and ERC 90 Sagaie reconnaissance and fire support vehicles as well as the VAB Mephisto.

History 
According to the French Army's 2020 Defence White Paper it plans to retire its AMX 10 RC and ERC 90 Sagaie vehicles beginning in 2020, and replace them with up to 250 examples of a new armoured reconnaissance vehicle. A consortium of Nexter, Thales, and Renault Trucks Defense was formed to develop and produce the new vehicle. The same consortium also builds the VBMR Griffon multi-role armoured vehicle for the French Army, which shares 70% of its components with the EBRC Jaguar.

On 6 December 2014, French Defence Minister Jean-Yves Le Drian announced that deliveries will commence in 2020 and a first tranche of 20 Jaguars and 319 Griffons was ordered in April 2017. A second tranche for 271 Griffons and 42 Jaguars was ordered on 24 September 2020. In total the French Army plans to buy 1,872 Griffons and 300 Jaguars.

Belgium 
On 26 October 2018, Belgium's cabinet formalised the plan to purchase 60 "Jaguar" and 382 “Griffon” vehicles for €1.5 billion. The vehicles will replace the Belgian Army's Piranha IIIC armoured personnel carriers and Dingo 2 infantry mobility vehicles. The deal includes spare parts and secure communications equipment and deliveries are planned to commence in 2025. Final assembly, including the conversion to the various specific variants and testing of the vehicles, will happen at a local contractor in Belgium.

Design 
It was originally intended for the consortium manufacturing the Griffon and Jaguar to keep the price per unit of the vehicles under €1 million; basing them on the same 6×6 commercial all-terrain truck chassis and the use of standard commercial truck engines were meant to facilitate this. The engines were to be adapted to use a wider range of fuel. The cost constraints was later scrapped however and both vehicles ended up costing more, with the EBRC Jaguar having a unit price of around €5 million (FY2022). 

The Jaguar has an overpressure system to maintain constant overpressure in the armoured troop compartment to protect it against chemical, biological and radiological threats. For service in hot climates the Jaguar is equipped with air conditioning. The vehicle is built with STANAG 4569 Level 4 armour protection, giving it defence against 14.5×114mm armour-piercing rounds, 155mm artillery shell splinters, and  mine blasts. Electronic defences include the Thales Group Barage active jamming device to counter IEDs, two sets of Antares missile warning alert systems, a TDA Armaments active blocking system, and a roof-mounted Metravib Pilar V gunfire locator.

The Jaguar's primary weapon, mounted in a two-man turret, is the CTA International CT40 cannon firing 40mm case telescoped ammunition with a rate of fire of 200 rounds per minute and a maximum effective range of 1,500 meters. Two Akeron MP anti-tank guided missiles are fitted to the turret launcher with two reloads stored inside. It also carries a 7.62mm remote controlled machine gun mounted on top of the turret and fourteen smoke grenades. The Jaguar can elevate its cannon to 45°, allowing it to fire on some aerial targets.

Operators 

  – The French Army plans to buy 300 Jaguars, 1,872 Griffons and 978 Servals (a variant of the Griffon) by 2030 under the Scorpion program as well as an additional 1060 Serval VLTP P segment haut vehicles by 2033.
  – The Belgian Army will buy 60 Jaguars and 382 Griffons.

In popular culture
The EBRC Jaguar is featured in the 2021 first-person shooter Battlefield 2042, where it is referred to as the EBAA Wildcat. In-game it is utilized by both the American and Russian factions.

References

External links 
 Metravib Defence 

Wheeled reconnaissance vehicles
Fire support vehicles
Nexter Systems
Six-wheeled vehicles
Military vehicles introduced in the 2020s